The Pacific Office Automation 147 is a  NASCAR Xfinity Series race that is held at the Portland International Raceway road course in Portland, Oregon.

This race replaced the B&L Transport 170, the series' race at the Mid-Ohio Sports Car Course.

It the only standalone race on the Xfinity Series schedule and is held on the same weekend as the NASCAR Cup Series race at Gateway and the Truck Series race at Gateway. An ARCA Menards Series West race will be held at the track on the same weekend as this race.

A NASCAR Camping World Truck Series race was previously held at this track in 1999 and 2000. The Xfinity Series race at Portland will mark the first time since then that a NASCAR national series has had a race in the Pacific Northwest.

History
On September 18, 2021, Elizabeth Blackstock from Jalopnik reported that there were rumors of the track hosting an Xfinity Series race and a Truck Series race in 2022. On September 25, Jordan Bianchi from The Athletic reported that Portland would likely be on the 2022 Xfinity Series schedule. The schedule was released on September 29 with Portland on Saturday, June 4. It replaced the race at another road course, the Mid-Ohio Sports Car Course. Both the Mid-Ohio and Portland races were promoted Green Savoree Racing Promotions. Mid-Ohio was given a Truck Series race after losing their Xfinity Series date.

The race will be 147 miles and 75 laps long according to NASCAR.com. Each of the stages will be 25 laps in length.

On April 19, 2022, the track announced that Pacific Office Automation, a company located in nearby Beaverton, Oregon that makes technology for office space, would be the title sponsor of the race.

Past winners

References

External links
 

NASCAR Xfinity Series races
Annual sporting events in the United States